Jeffrey Gerrish is an American lawyer. He previously served as the Deputy United States Trade Representative, Gerrish was previously a partner in the International Trade Group at Skadden, Arps, Slate, Meagher & Flom. Gerrish was a member of President Trump's trade transition team.

Gerrish has experience litigating trade disputes before the United States Department of Commerce, International Trade Commission, federal courts, North American Free Trade Agreement bi-national panels, and the World Trade Organization. He has been appointed by the chief judge of the United States Court of International Trade to serve as a member of the court's Rules Advisory Committee.

On April 24, 2018, President Trump appointed Gerrish as the acting chairman and president of the Export–Import Bank of the United States. Gerrish served in this position until May 9, 2019, upon the swearing-in of Kimberly A. Reed.

Gerrish was chosen to lead the US-delegation in trade-talks with China beginning in mid-January 2019. He is seen as having a close world view to Robert Lighthizer, who mentored him, and, thus, was expected to take a tough stance against China in these talks.

In August 2020, he rejoined Skadden, Arps, Slate, Meagher & Flom.

References

External links
USTR biography

Living people
University at Albany, SUNY alumni
Duke University School of Law alumni
21st-century American lawyers
Export–Import Bank of the United States people
Trump administration personnel
Skadden, Arps, Slate, Meagher & Flom people
Year of birth missing (living people)